Nadkarni is a surname commonly found in the Indian states of Maharashtra, Goa and Karnataka. Notable people with the surname include:

 Bapu Nadkarni (1933–2020), Indian cricketer
 Dayanand S. Nadkarni (1910–2000), Indian politician
 Nalini Nadkarni (born 1954), American ecologist
 Ramesh L. Nadkarni (1921–1995), Hindustani singer
Sucheta Nadkarni (1967–2019), academic in the field of management
 Sundar Rao Nadkarni, Indian film actor
 Sushil Nadkarni (born 1976), American cricketer
 Jayant Ganpat Nadkarni (1931–2018), Admiral in Indian Navy, 14th Chief of the Naval staff
 Anuradha Paudwal aka Alka Nadkarni (born 1954), Indian playback singer

Indian surnames